Gonioneura is a genus of flies belonging to the family Lesser Dung flies.

Species
G. asymmetrica (Marshall, 1982)
G. exserta (Marshall, 1982)
G. spinipennis (Haliday, 1836)
G. xinjiangensis Marshall in Marshall & Sun, 1995

References

Sphaeroceridae
Diptera of North America
Diptera of Australasia
Diptera of Asia
Brachycera genera
Taxa named by Camillo Rondani